Fox 26 may refer to one of the following television stations in the United States affiliated with the Fox Broadcasting Company:

Current
KMPH-TV, Fresno / Visalia, California
KMVU-DT, Medford, Oregon
KNPN-LD, St. Joseph, Missouri
KRIV (TV), Houston, Texas (O&O)
WSFX-TV, Wilmington, North Carolina

Former
K26ES, Casper, Wyoming (on channel 26 from 1999 to 2014; now KWYF-LD and on channel 27) 
KFTC (TV), Bemidji, Minnesota (re-broadcast of WFTC in Minneapolis, Minnesota from 1988 to 2002; now owned-and-operated by MyNetworkTV)
KNDX, Bismarck, North Dakota (affiliated with Fox from 1999 to 2014; now KNDB and affiliated with Heroes & Icons)
WGBA-TV, Green Bay, Wisconsin (affiliated with Fox from 1992 to 1995; now affiliated with NBC)